Rialto were an English rock band formed in London in 1997. They released their self-titled debut album in 1998, followed by their second and final album, Night on Earth, in 2001. Their single "Untouchable" reached the top 20 in the UK Singles Chart. In the summer of 1998, Rialto became the first ever UK chart band to release a single exclusively through the internet.

Despite finding favour with music critics, with Melody Maker anticipating "a fairytale future of Oasis-like proportions", the band were famously dropped by their label East West, a Warner Music Group imprint, a month before the release of their heavily promoted eponymous debut album, denting the group's chances of major commercial success. Neil McCormick noted that Rialto were "among the most critically acclaimed and highly touted new groups to emerge" of the late 1990s, making "carefully crafted, Beatlesque pop, with an epic, cinematic sound and slightly sinister lyrics". The group gained a following in East Asia, particularly in South Korea where their debut reached the number one spot in the album charts.

Band members
 Louis Eliot – lead vocalist, guitar, songwriter
 Jonny Bull – guitar, programming, backing vocals, producer
 Julian Taylor – bass, backing vocals and trumpet
 Pete Cuthbert – drums
 Toby Hounsham – keyboards (1997–2000)
 Anthony Christmas – drums (1997–2000)

Biography
Rialto grew from the remains of the band Kinky Machine, which featured singer Louis Eliot and guitarist Jonny Bull. Kinky Machine released two albums: their self-titled debut in 1993 (Oxygen/MCA Records) and Bent in 1995.

In 1997, Eliot and Bull rejoined and, with the addition of bassist Julian Taylor, drummer Pete Cuthbert and keyboardist Toby Hounsham, formed Rialto. Later that year, they released their first singles, "When We're Together" and "Untouchable." The latter was re-released in January 1998 and cracked the Top 20 in the UK Singles Chart. Despite the anticipated arrival of their self-titled debut album, East West Records dropped them from their label, with China Records releasing the album on 13 July 1998 instead.

A six-track EP, Girl On A Train, followed in 2000, receiving accolades from NME and Q magazines. By the time Rialto gathered to make a second album, Hounsham and Christmas had left the group, leaving them as a four-piece. The band released their second and final album, Night on Earth, in 2001.

Post-band activities
Following the band's split, Eliot released his solo debut, the Everybody Loves You When You're Dead EP, in 2002, followed by his full-length debut, Long Way Round, on Iodine Records in 2004.

Bull co-wrote the song "Friday Night" with Lily Allen at his studio in southwest Portugal. The song ended up on her debut album Alright, Still. In 2011, he wrote and sang the song for the "Ph. Diddy" video produced by Invitrogen to illustrate life in a biotechnology laboratory.

Toby Hounsham now plays keyboards for The Stranglers and Mungo Jerry.

Discography

Albums 
 Rialto (1998) – UK No. 21
 Night on Earth (2001)

EP 
 Girl on a Train (2000)

Singles 
 "When We're Together" (1997)
 "Monday Morning 5.19" (1997) – UK No. 37
 "Untouchable" (1998) – UK No. 20
 "Dream Another Dream" (1998) – UK No. 39
 "Summer's Over" (1998) – UK No. 60 
 "Anything Could Happen" (2001) - UK No. 85
 "London Crawling" (2001)

References

External links
Inspiracy - Rialto fansite
Biography at MTV.com

English alternative rock groups
Britpop groups
Musical groups from London
Musical groups established in 1997
Musical groups disestablished in 2002
East West Records artists
Eagle Records artists
China Records artists
MNRK Music Group artists